"Fly" is a song by American actress and singer Hilary Duff for her 2004 self-titled third studio album. The song was written by Kara DioGuardi and John Shanks, who also produced the song. The song was first released in the United States on August 10, 2004, by Hollywood Records as the lead single from Hilary Duff. It was released again by Angel Records on March 13, 2006, in the United Kingdom as the fourth and final single from Duff's first compilation album, Most Wanted (2005).

Composition
The song's protagonist encourages listeners to "let go of your yesterday" and "reach for something when there's nothing left". Duff has described it as "an uplifting song in the face of all the negativity going around these days. It's about how people are scared to open up and show who they are inside because they're afraid of what others are going to say".

Critical reception
Stylus magazine said the song was very similar to Duff's previous single, "Come Clean" (2004), but called it "an easily excusable offense, as it improves on the template ... [it] rightfully leads off the album." Blender magazine said the song is "Urgent and theatrical" and "sounds like Evanescence—but the inspirational lyrics are pure Duff." John Shanks received a 2005 Grammy Award for Producer of the Year, Non-Classical for his work on "Fly" and recordings by Ashlee Simpson, Kelly Clarkson, Sheryl Crow, Robbie Robertson and Alanis Morissette.

Chart performance
"Fly" failed to enter the Billboard Hot 100 in the U.S., but peaked at number 29 on Billboards Mainstream Top 40 chart. As of July 27, 2014, the song had sold 284,000 digital copies in the United States.

Music video
The single's music video, directed by Chris Applebaum, combines black-and-white backstage footage with colorized shots of Duff performing the song live. The video was filmed in Worcester, Massachusetts during rehearsal  for her Most Wanted Tour. Footage of the crowd was from opening night of the tour in Worcester. The video premiered on MTV's Total Request Live on August 26, 2004, debuted on the show's countdown on August 30 and reached number one on the countdown for one day. It spent twenty-eight days on the countdown, until October 27. There was about 100 or more fans there who won a contest to watch her perform and be in the video as a crowd. The making of the video and her tour in Worcester is on the 2004 DVD Learning to Fly. It is also featured on the Raise Your Voice DVD under bonus features.

Live performances
Duff performed "Fly" on the 2004 World Music Awards.

Track listingsDigital download "Fly" – 3:45Australian CD single "Fly" – 3:45
 "Fly" (Remix by Dan Chase) – 3:27European CD single "Fly" – 3:44
 "Fly" (Remix) – 3:44UK CD single "Fly" – 3:43
 "Fly" (Live AOL Session) – 3:44UK maxi single'
 "Fly" – 3:43
 "Metamorphosis" – 3:28
 "Fly" (Remix) – 3:44
 "Fly" (Video) – 3:43

Charts

Release history

References

External links
 

2000s ballads
2004 singles
2004 songs
Hilary Duff songs
Hollywood Records singles
Music videos directed by Chris Applebaum
Pop ballads
Rock ballads
Song recordings produced by John Shanks
Songs written by John Shanks
Songs written by Kara DioGuardi